The name Gabrielle has been used for nine tropical cyclones worldwide, six in the Atlantic Ocean, one in the South-West Indian Ocean and two in the Australian region.

In the Atlantic:
  Hurricane Gabrielle (1989) – reached Category 4 and, though never striking land, caused large ocean swells on the East Coast of the United States that killed eight.
 Tropical Storm Gabrielle (1995) – strengthened rapidly but formed too close to land to reach hurricane strength before making landfall in Mexico, causing minimal damage.
 Hurricane Gabrielle (2001) – made landfall near Venice, Florida as a tropical storm, exited back into the ocean and strengthened into a minimal hurricane, degenerating south of Newfoundland.
 Tropical Storm Gabrielle (2007) – subtropical storm that became a weak tropical storm prior to making landfall on the Outer Banks of North Carolina, causing light damage.
 Tropical Storm Gabrielle (2013) – short-lived, weak tropical storm that formed and dissipated in the Caribbean Sea south of Puerto Rico, but reformed close to Bermuda.
 Tropical Storm Gabrielle (2019) – weak and disorganized tropical storm that dissipated over the eastern Atlantic, but later regenerated and intensified into a moderate tropical storm.

In the South-West Indian:
 Tropical Storm Gabrielle (1982) – a moderate tropical storm that brushed the islands of Mauritius and Réunion without causing damage. 

In the Australian region:
 Tropical Low Gabrielle (2009) – downgraded to a tropical low in post-analysis, did not affect land.
 Cyclone Gabrielle (2023) – a strong tropical cyclone which crossed to the South Pacific basin and severely affected New Zealand as a subtropical system.

Atlantic hurricane set index articles
South-West Indian Ocean cyclone set index articles